Kopanong Local Municipality is an administrative area in the Xhariep District of the Free State in South Africa. The name is a Sesotho word meaning "meeting place or where people are invited". The name earmarks unity and seeks to encourage co-operation.

Main places
The 2001 census divided the municipality into the following main places:

Politics 

The municipal council consists of seventeen members elected by mixed-member proportional representation. Nine councillors are elected by first-past-the-post voting in nine wards, while the remaining eight are chosen from party lists so that the total number of party representatives is proportional to the number of votes received. In the 2021 South African municipal elections the African National Congress (ANC) won a majority of eleven seats on the council.

The following table shows the results of the 2021 election.

References

External links
 http://www.kopanong.gov.za/

Local municipalities of the Xhariep District Municipality